James Ashley Corcoran  (born 10 February 1949 in Sherbrooke, Quebec) is a Canadian singer-songwriter and former broadcaster.

Biography
Jim Corcoran was born in Sherbrooke, but went to high school and obtained his B.A. in Boston, Massachusetts in the late 1960s. The former seminarian returned to his native Quebec in 1970 with the idea to continue his studies at Bishop's University in Lennoxville before becoming a Latin professor. Corcoran received his B.A. from Bishop's University in 1973 In his free time Corcoran taught himself guitar. His first language is English, but he has spent most of his musical career singing in French.

In 1972, he formed the duo Jim et Bertrand with Bertrand Gosselin and they began performing in the Eastern Townships. During the 1970s, the group was associated with Quebec folk music. Corcoran began a solo career in francophone music after the group disbanded in 1979.

From 1988 to 2018, Corcoran hosted the CBC Radio program À Propos, a program presenting the francophone popular music scene of Quebec, Canada and the world to the English network's audience. After producer Frank Opolko suggested that Corcoran provide English translations of some of Quebec's most popular songs, the show started to find a large English audience. After announcing his retirement from broadcasting, he hosted the final episode of À Propos on 2 September 2018; the following week, a new program C'est formidable!, hosted by Florence Khoriaty, made its debut. It is produced and recorded by Frank Opolko.

He wrote music for Cirque du Soleil's productions KÀ, Quidam and Wintuk. "Let Me Fall", a song Corcoran co-wrote with Benoît Jutras for Quidam, was recorded by Josh Groban for his self-titled album. Corcoran also portrayed the part of David in performances of the opera Nelligan in 1990.

Bishop's University granted Corcoran an honorary Doctor of Civil Law on 29 October 2004.

Awards and recognition
1981: Félix Award: Best folk record, Têtu
1984: Spa Festival, Belgium: Best francophone song, "J'ai fait mon chemin seul"
1987: Prix CIEL-Raymond Lévesque
1990: Félix Award: Best singer-songwriter, Corcoran
2006: Juno Award: Francophone Album of the Year, Pages blanches
2016: Induction to the Canadian Songwriters Hall of Fame for his song, "J’ai la tête en gigue"
2022: Order of Canada, with the rank of Officer.

Discography

With Bertrand Gosselin (Jim & Bertrand)
 1972: Jim Corcoran & Bertrand Gosselin
 1975: Île d'entrée
 1977: La Tête en Gigue
 1979: À l'abri de la Tempête

In Solo

 1981: Têtu
 1983: Plaisirs
 1986: Miss Kalabash
 1990: Corcoran
 1994: Zola à vélo
 1996: Portraits
 2000: Entre tout et moi
 2005: Pages blanches

Videography
 1986: Djeddhy Duvah (En chair et en os)
 1986: Perdus dans le même décor
 1990: C'est pour ça que je t'aime
 1990: Ton amour est trop lourd
 1990: Je me tutoie
 1990: La Nostalgie
 1990: Le Boogie
 1994: L'Amour n'est pas éternel
 2001: On s'est presque touché
 2001: J'vais changer le monde
 2002: Mme Poupart
 2005: Éloge du doute
 2007: Docteur Gamache

References

External links
  Quebec Info Musique: Biography
  The Canadian Encyclopedia: Jim Corcoran
 CBC Radio: À Propos
 

1949 births
Living people
Canadian singer-songwriters
Canadian male singers
Juno Award for Francophone Album of the Year winners
Musicians from Sherbrooke
Anglophone Quebec people
Quebec people of Irish descent
CBC Radio hosts
Audiogram (label) artists
French-language singers of Canada
Bishop's University alumni
Canadian expatriates in the United States
Félix Award winners
Canadian male singer-songwriters
Officers of the Order of Canada
Musicians from Montreal